USS Richard B. Russell (SSN-687), a  attack submarine, has been the only ship of the United States Navy to be named for Richard B. Russell, Jr. (1897–1971), United States Senator from Georgia (1933–1971).

Construction and commissioning
The contract for Richard B. Russells construction was awarded on 25 July 1969 and her keel was laid down 19 October 1971 by Newport News Shipbuilding at Newport News, Virginia, authenticated by Mrs. Ina Russell Stacey, sister and official hostess for Senator Russell. Richard B. Russell was launched at Newport News on 12 January 1974, sponsored by Mrs. Leila Elizabeth (Betty) Talmadge (née Shingler), wife of Herman E. Talmadge (1913–2002), U.S. Senator from Georgia (1957–1981), and commissioned on 16 August 1975.

Service history

In August 1977, Richard B. Russell was fitted with a large housing attached to her hull just aft of her sail, containing a tethered antenna buoy that was under development. The housing, called a "bustle" (and particularly the "Russell bustle"), gave her a unique profile and her nickname became "Dickey "B"." Later submarine classes would have their antenna buoy housings built into their hull fairings.

One point of interest about the fitting of the bustle came about as it was being installed. A crane was used to lift the bustle for the installation process. The crane used had insufficient capacity to lift the bustle. The bustle went into the water, and the crane was pulled onto its side. Two people were pinned under the crane until another barge-mounted crane was brought in to lift the bustle from the water, and right the other crane.

In 1978, Richard B. Russell completed a three-month deployment in the North Atlantic Ocean for which she received a Navy Unit Commendation and an Expeditionary Medal.

In 1980, Richard B. Russell completed a five-month deployment in the Mediterranean Sea.  In 1981 she completed a deployment in the North Atlantic Ocean for which she received a Meritorious Unit Commendation and an Expeditionary Medal.

The Richard B. Russell was used in covert operations, gathering intelligence on Soviet naval movements.

In 1982, Richard B. Russell went through the Panama Canal and arrived at Mare Island Naval Shipyard in Vallejo, California, for an extended overhaul.  During her time at Mare Island, it was decided that she would become a special projects submarine.  After a short period of post-overhaul testing and sea trials, she underwent extensive ocean engineering modifications prior to commencing operations as a unit of Submarine Development Group 1.  As a member of Sub Dev Group 1, she spearheaded a testing program for submarine rescue technology.

Richard B. Russells role as a fast attack submarine as well as a development and testing platform earned her the Presidential Unit Citation, the highest award any naval unit can be given. She also earned six Navy Unit Commendations, and seven Battle Effectiveness Awards (formerly the Battle Efficiency Award), commonly known as the Battle "E", during her career.

Richard B. Russell was placed in reserve while still in commission on 1 July 1993.

Decommissioning and disposal
Richard B. Russell was both decommissioned and stricken from the Naval Vessel Register on 24 June 1994. She was stored at Bremerton, Washington, until 1 October 2001, when she entered the Nuclear-Powered Ship and Submarine Recycling Program at Puget Sound Naval Shipyard in Bremerton for scrapping. Her scrapping was completed on 3 January 2003.

References
This article includes awards information from the "official website" for the USS Richard B. Russell (SSN687).

NavSource Online: Submarine Photo Archive Richard B. Russell (SSN-687)

First-hand information from crew member - Enson 1st Class Peter Sagi

Ships built in Newport News, Virginia
Sturgeon-class submarines
Cold War submarines of the United States
Nuclear submarines of the United States Navy
1974 ships